Tera Pyar Nahi Bhoole was a 2011 television series that aired on PTV. The series was written by Jahanzeb Qamar, directed by Fauzia Siddique, and produced by Rafique Ahmad Warraich. It stars Ahsan Khan and Saba Qamar in their third on-screen appearance after Dastan in 2010 and Pani Jaisa Pyar in the same year. The serial was quite popular among viewers and also won the Lux Style Awards for Best Television Play. The serial received seven nominations at the annual PTV Awards.

Cast
Ahsan Khan as Hadi
Saba Qamar as Zartash
Asma Abbas
Saba Faisal
Firdous Jamal
Mustafa Qureshi
Imran Arooj
Raima Khan
Nausheen Agha
Saleema Sipra
Bindiya as Wulusha

Accolades

References

2011 Pakistani television series debuts
Pakistani television series